Vignale is the luxury car sub-brand of Ford Motor Company used in automobiles sold in Europe. The former company Carrozzeria Alfredo Vignale was an Italian automobile coachbuilder established in 1948 at Via Cigliano, Turin, by Alfredo Vignale (1913–69). After its founder's death in 1969, Carrozzeria Vignale was acquired by De Tomaso (founded by Argentine businessman and race driver Alejandro de Tomaso). The studio ceased operation in 1973, but ownership of the name was taken over by Ford Motor Company (which had majority ownership of De Tomaso).

Since then, Ford has continued to use the name sporadically to the present day. Up to present days, Ford of Europe released Vignale versions of models Mondeo, Edge, Fiesta, Focus, and Kuga, among others.

History 

The first body on a Fiat 500 Topolino base was made in 1948, followed by a special Fiat 1100. Most customers were Italian firms such as Cisitalia, Alfa Romeo, Ferrari, Fiat, Maserati, Lancia. In 1952, Vignale collaborated with Briggs Cunningham to jointly produce the Continental C-3. A close cooperation was maintained with Giovanni Michelotti, who in 1959 opened his own design studio and in 1962 definitely concluded the cooperation. 

Also Rodolfo Bonetto designed a couple of cars in the early 1950s before moving to Boneschi. Later Vignale designs were created by Virginio Vairo. Vignale also designed and built cars themselves, usually low volume variants of the main production cars of these automobile manufacturers. Amongst them were 850, Samantha, Eveline and the Vignale Gamine, based on the Fiat 500. In 1968, Vignale designed the body of their last prototype, the Tatra 613. Vignale was taken over by De Tomaso in 1969 who already owned Carrozzeria Ghia. Shortly after selling, Alfredo Vignale died in a car crash on November 16, 1969. Both coachbuilders were sold to Ford in 1973 but the Vignale brand was discontinued.

At the 1993 Geneva Motor Show, Aston Martin, at the time owned by Ford, produced a concept car called Lagonda Vignale. Ford then used the Vignale name in the Ford Focus Vignale concept car introduced at the 2004 Paris Motor Show, however the production model was named as Ford Focus Coupé-Cabriolet.

In September 2013, Ford of Europe announced plans to resurrect the Vignale name as an upscale luxury sub-brand of Ford. The cars would be visually distincted from regular Ford products and have an improved dealership experience. Exclusive services, such as free lifetime car washes, will be offered as well. The first Ford model to receive the Vignale name was the 2015 Ford Mondeo. The first model to carry the Vignale brand name was the 2015 Mondeo.

On 1 March 2016 Ford of Europe announced a Kuga Vignale concept vehicle at the Geneva Motor Show where the company also announced the line-up of Vignale products, S-Max, Edge, and Mondeo Vignale five-door models debut alongside Kuga Vignale Concept, offering a vision of the future of upscale SUVs as well as revealing Vignale Ambassadors and the signature Vignale collection.

Designs 
List of cars designed and bodied at Carrozzeria Vignale or coachbuilt to a third-party design.

 Abarth 204A Berlinetta
 Abarth 205A Berlinetta
 Alfa Romeo 412 Barchetta, 1951
 Alfa Romeo 1900 La Fleche Spider and Coupé.
 Alfa Romeo 2000 Coupé
 American Motors AMX 1966 Coupé
 Aston Martin DB2/4 Coupé
 Cisitalia 202, 202 CMM
 Cunningham C-3 Coupé and Cabriolet
 Daihatsu Compagno
 Ferrari 166 MM Coupé and Spider
 Ferrari 166 Inter Coupé
 Ferrari 212 Export Barchetta, Spider, Cabriolet and Coupé
 Ferrari 212 Inter Coupé, Spider and Cabriolet
 Ferrari 225 S Coupé and Spider
 Ferrari 250 S Coupé
 Ferrari 250 MM Coupé and Spider
 Ferrari 250 Europa Coupé and Spider
 Ferrari 250 Europa GT Coupé
 Ferrari 340 America Coupé and Spider
 Ferrari 340 Mexico Coupé and Spider
 Ferrari 340 MM Spider
 Ferrari 342 America Cabriolet
 Ferrari 625 TF Coupé and Spider
 Ferrari 375 America Coupé
 Ferrari 330 GT Shooting brake, rebodied in 1967
 Fiat 600 Coupé, Spider
 Fiat 850 Coupé, Spider, Berlina
 Fiat 1400 Cabriolet
 Fiat 1300 and 1500 Sportiva fastback.
 Fiat 1500 Coupé 
 Fiat 124 Coupé Eveline
 Fiat 125 Coupé Samantha 
 Fiat 8V Coupé, Cabriolet and Demon Rouge
 Ford-Cisitalia 808 coupé and roadster
 Jensen Interceptor, early production
 Jensen FF, early production
 Jensen Nova concept car
 Lancia Appia Cabriolet, 1957; Lusso Coupé, prototype and series production cars
 Lancia Aprilia Coupé for Vignale, 1949
 Lancia Aurelia B50 Coupé and Berlina; B52 Coupé
 Lancia Aurelia Nardi Blue Ray 1 and 2, commissioned by Enrico Nardi
 Lancia Flavia Cabriolet, would become the last Michelotti design for Vignale
 Lincoln by Vignale, a 1987 show car
 Maserati A6G 2000 Coupé, Paris Show car
 Maserati A6GCS/53 Spider Corsa, commissioned by Tony Parravano and rebodied by Scaglietti in 1955.
 Maserati 3500 GT Spyder, prototypes and series production cars
 Maserati Sebring 1962, prototype and series production cars
 Maserati Mexico prototype, based on a Maserati 5000 GT chassis rebodied in 1965.
 Maserati Mexico series production car 
 Maserati Indy
 Matra M530 Sport prototype
 O.S.C.A. MT4-2AD Coupé
 Packard Eight 'Victoria' Vignale Cabriolet (built in 1948 on a 1939 chassis)
 Standard Vanguard Vignale
 Tatra 613 prototypes and production cars
 De Tomaso Pantera, early production
 Triumph Italia
 Vignale Gamine by Alfredo Vignale

Notable designers
 Alfredo Vignale
 Giovanni Michelotti
 Virginio Vairo

References

Bibliography

External links

 Coachbuild.com Encyclopedia: Vignale
 Vignale Gamine
 About Carrozzeria Vignale
 Lancia Aurelia B52 Vignale

Coachbuilders of Italy
Defunct motor vehicle manufacturers of Italy
Ford of Europe
Vehicle manufacturing companies established in 1948
Italian companies established in 1948